In computational complexity and cryptography, two families of distributions are computationally indistinguishable if no efficient algorithm can tell the difference between them except with negligible probability.

Formal definition
Let  and  be two distribution ensembles indexed by a security parameter n (which usually refers to the length of the input); we say they are computationally indistinguishable if for any non-uniform probabilistic polynomial time algorithm A, the following quantity is a negligible function in n:

 

denoted . Another interpretation of computational indistinguishability, is that polynomial-time algorithms actively trying to distinguish between the two ensembles cannot do so: that any such algorithm will only perform negligibly better than if one were to just guess.

Related notions
Implicit in the definition is the condition that the algorithm, must decide based on a single sample from one of the distributions. One might conceive of a situation in which the algorithm trying to distinguish between two distributions, could access as many samples as it needed. Hence two ensembles that cannot be distinguished by polynomial-time algorithms looking at multiple samples are deemed indistinguishable by polynomial-time sampling'. If the polynomial-time algorithm can generate samples in polynomial time, or has access to a random oracle that generates samples for it, then indistinguishability by polynomial-time sampling is equivalent to computational indistinguishability.

References

External links
 Yehuda Lindell. Introduction to Cryptography
 Donald Beaver and Silvio Micali and Phillip Rogaway, The Round Complexity of Secure Protocols (Extended Abstract), 1990, pp. 503–513
 Shafi Goldwasser and Silvio Micali. Probabilistic Encryption. JCSS, 28(2):270–299, 1984
 Oded Goldreich. Foundations of Cryptography: Volume 2 – Basic Applications. Cambridge University Press, 2004.
 Jonathan Katz, Yehuda Lindell, "Introduction to Modern Cryptography: Principles and Protocols," Chapman & Hall/CRC, 2007

Algorithmic information theory